Edwin Hone Kempson  (1862–1931) was the second Suffragan Bishop of Warrington. Born on 16 April 1862 and educated at Rugby and Christ Church, Oxford, he was ordained in 1886 and began a career in education. He was successively an assistant master at Clifton College, a Housemaster at Harrow and finally Principal of King William's College, Isle of Man. From 1912 until 1920 he was Canon Residentiary of Newcastle Cathedral before ascending to the  Episcopate in 1920, a post he held for seven years.

Notes

1862 births
People educated at Rugby School
Alumni of Christ Church, Oxford
Bishops of Warrington
1931 deaths
20th-century Church of England bishops